The Fas languages are a small language family of Papua New Guinea.

Classification
Despite the fact that the family consists of just two closely related languages, Baibai and Fas (40% cognate), there has been considerable confusion over its membership, apparently due to a misalignment in the publication (Loving & Bass 1964) of the data used for the initial classification. (See Baron 1983.) The initial name of the family was Fas, but Laycock (1975) changed it to Baibai when he mistakenly moved the Fas language to the Kwomtari family, an error perpetuated in much of the literature. Baibai (Baibai and Biaka) is therefore not a synonym for the Fas family (Baibai and Fas). See Kwomtari–Fas languages for details.

A few regular sound correspondences are apparent (Baron 1983:21 ff):

The odd change from *nd to /k/ (via *hr) has also occurred in the Bewani languages and some of the Vanimo languages.

* metathesis still operates in Fas.  and  metathesis has been reconstructed.

* is lost in some environments. Baibai  may be phonemically .

Baron sees no evidence that the similarities between the Fas and Kwomtari families are any greater than with neighboring unrelated families, and thus doubts the validity of the putative Kwomtari–Fas family.

Phonological features
Two papers were published by Wietze Baron (1979, 1983a) on the phonology of Fas. Baron argued that the phonological processes of Fas contradict claims by proponents of Natural Generative Phonology that Paul Kiparsky's Opacity Principle allowed no exceptions. See Optimality theory for later developments in phonological theory. Further papers are posted on his website. Recently an honours thesis by Fiona Blake (University of Sydney) has also been posted on the web; she refers to Fas as Momu.

The Fas language apparently has a seven-vowel system. It also has a bilabial trill  (Baron 1979:95), even though Laycock (1975:854) had expressed his doubts about earlier reports of this feature by Capell (1962).

Proto-language
Some lexical reconstructions of Proto-Baibai-Momu (i.e., Proto-Fas) by Usher (2020) are:

{| class="wikitable sortable"
! gloss !! Proto-Baibai-Momu
|-
| older brother || *apɛ
|-
| name || *ambu
|-
| smoke || *mVsV
|-
| star || *mɛmbVkɛ
|-
| mother (addressing) || *mɛ
|-
| flying fox || *mɛnɛ
|-
| net bag || *man
|-
| shoulder || *mandVɸV
|-
| woman || *mɔŋgɔ
|-
| water/river || *ɸi
|-
| salt || *ɸVn[ɛ]
|-
| breast/milk || *ɸVki
|-
| house || *ɸVndV
|-
| axe || *tɔmakɔ
|-
| liver || *tVtV
|-
| hand || *ndɛŋgi
|-
| know || *ndam...
|-
| tobacco || *ndandVɸi
|-
| fire || *ndɔa
|-
| bow || *ndVmas
|-
| many || *ndɔambɔ
|-
| fat/grease || *sVmbu
|-
| black || *sVŋgarɔ
|-
| bird-of-paradise sp. || *sujakɛ
|-
| eye || *kVri
|-
| axe || *ŋgambɛ
|-
| areca nut || *ŋgVmVsV
|-
| earth/ground || *ŋgVndV
|-
| egg || *handɔ
|-
| 2 sg. || *[h]aŋgi
|-
| skin || *hVraɔ
|-
| moon || *wVsi
|-
| 3 sg. || *wɔ
|-
| stone || *wɔneŋgrɛ
|}

References

 
 
 , posted at: 
 Blake, Fiona. 2007. 'Spatial reference in Momu'. Posted at

External links
Baibai-Momu. New Guinea World.

 
Language families
Northwest Papuan languages